Eberhard Werdin (19 October 1911 in Spenge – 25 May 1991 in Weilheim in Oberbayern) was a German composer and writer on music.

He studied in Hanover, Bielefeld and Cologne, and then became a schoolteacher. From 1955 to 1969 he was a lecturer at the conservatory in Düsseldorf, and in 1952 he became a professor at the Municipal Music School in Leverkusen.

Werdin wrote music for the stage, works for school orchestras as well as professional orchestras, choral music and chamber music, including a large number of works for brass instruments. He also wrote on aspects of musical education.

Compositions: Concertino Fur Flöte, Gitarre und Streichorchester (1969)

1911 births
1991 deaths
20th-century classical composers
German classical composers
Hochschule für Musik und Tanz Köln alumni
Officers Crosses of the Order of Merit of the Federal Republic of Germany
German male classical composers
20th-century German composers
20th-century German male musicians